Ivlevskoye is a rural locality (a village) in Novlenskoye Rural Settlement, Vologodsky District, Vologda Oblast, Russia. The population was 25 as of 2002.

Geography 
Ivlevskoye is located 81 km northwest of Vologda (the district's administrative centre) by road. Pervomaysky is the nearest rural locality.

References 

Rural localities in Vologodsky District